Central High School was a senior high school for African-American students in Galveston, Texas. It was a part of the Galveston Independent School District (GISD).

Lorraine Smith Tigner, quoted in the Galveston County Daily News, stated that Central, established as the Central School in 1885, was the first Texas school for black people. In its first year Central had 125 students. It was renamed Central High School the following year.

In 1949 it had 700 students. At the time fewer than 5% of the students who graduated attended universities and colleges.

In 1968 the school was consolidated with Ball High School, previously the school for white people.

Campus
In 1949 the cafeteria, located in the school's basement, was so small that the seating for students eating their meals was in the first floor gymnasium. There was no proper playground since the lot designated for it was filled with three frame shacks; students instead used an area alley for recreation. The students used the Colored Branch of the Rosenberg Library for research and study halls as the school did not have a library of its own. The frame shacks, which first received electricity in 1948, held a variety of classes. One shack was used for band classes; one held art, drawing, mechanics, and science classes; and one held the school's health classes. Bill Cherry of The Galveston County Daily News stated that while, by 1949, all GISD facilities were under-maintained, Central High School was the one that "blatantly showed" the deepest "lack of respect of its pupils’ human dignity".

Curriculum
The school offered cooking, home economics, sewing, and woodwork classes.

In 1949 the home economics courses used cooking ranges dating from 1910.

See also
 Education in Galveston, Texas

References

High schools in Galveston County, Texas
Public high schools in Texas
1885 establishments in Texas
Educational institutions established in 1885
1968 disestablishments in Texas
Educational institutions disestablished in 1968
Historically segregated African-American schools in Texas